Golgin subfamily A member 5 is a protein that in humans is encoded by the GOLGA5 gene.

The Golgi apparatus, which participates in glycosylation and transport of proteins and lipids in the secretory pathway, consists of a series of stacked cisternae (flattened membrane sacs). Interactions between the Golgi and microtubules are thought to be important for the reorganization of the Golgi after it fragments during mitosis. This gene encodes a member of the golgin family of proteins, whose members localize to the Golgi. This protein is a coiled-coil membrane protein that has been postulated to play a role in vesicle tethering and docking. Translocations involving this gene and the ret proto-oncogene have been found in tumor tissues; the chimeric sequences have been designated RET-II and PTC5.

Interactions
GOLGA5 has been shown to interact with RAB1A.

References

Further reading